

Peerage of England

|Duke of Cornwall (1337)||none||1537||1603||
|-
|Duke of Norfolk (1483)||Thomas Howard, 4th Duke of Norfolk||1554||1572||Attainted, and his honours were forfeited
|-
|Marquess of Northampton (1547)||William Parr, 1st Marquess of Northampton||1547||1571||Died, title extinct
|-
|rowspan="3"|Marquess of Winchester (1551)||William Paulet, 1st Marquess of Winchester||1551||1572||Died
|-
|John Paulet, 2nd Marquess of Winchester||1572||1576||Died
|-
|William Paulet, 3rd Marquess of Winchester||1576||1598||
|-
|Earl of Arundel (1138)||Henry FitzAlan, 19th Earl of Arundel||1544||1580||
|-
|Earl of Oxford (1142)||Edward de Vere, 17th Earl of Oxford||1562||1604||
|-
|Earl of Westmorland (1397)||Charles Neville, 6th Earl of Westmorland||1564||1571||Attainted
|-
|Earl of Shrewsbury (1442)||George Talbot, 6th Earl of Shrewsbury||1560||1590||
|-
|rowspan="2"|Earl of Kent (1465)||Reginald Grey, 5th Earl of Kent||1562||1573||Died
|-
|Henry Grey, 6th Earl of Kent||1573||1615||
|-
|rowspan="2"|Earl of Derby (1485)||Edward Stanley, 3rd Earl of Derby||1521||1572||Died
|-
|Henry Stanley, 4th Earl of Derby||1572||1593||
|-
|Earl of Worcester (1514)||William Somerset, 3rd Earl of Worcester||1549||1589||
|-
|rowspan="2"|Earl of Cumberland (1525)||Henry Clifford, 2nd Earl of Cumberland||1542||1570||Died
|-
|George Clifford, 3rd Earl of Cumberland||1570||1605||
|-
|Earl of Rutland (1525)||Edward Manners, 3rd Earl of Rutland||1563||1587||
|-
|Earl of Huntingdon (1529)||Henry Hastings, 3rd Earl of Huntingdon||1561||1595||
|-
|Earl of Sussex (1529)||Thomas Radclyffe, 3rd Earl of Sussex||1557||1583||
|-
|Earl of Bath (1536)||William Bourchier, 3rd Earl of Bath||1561||1623||
|-
|Earl of Southampton (1547)||Henry Wriothesley, 2nd Earl of Southampton||1550||1581||
|-
|Earl of Bedford (1550)||Francis Russell, 2nd Earl of Bedford||1555||1585||
|-
|rowspan="2"|Earl of Pembroke (1551)||William Herbert, 1st Earl of Pembroke||1551||1570||Died
|-
|Henry Herbert, 2nd Earl of Pembroke||1570||1601||
|-
|Earl of Devon (1553)||William Courtenay, de jure 3rd Earl of Devon||1557||1630||
|-
|rowspan="2"|Earl of Northumberland (1557)||Thomas Percy, 7th Earl of Northumberland||1557||1572||Died
|-
|Henry Percy, 8th Earl of Northumberland||1572||1585||
|-
|Earl of Hertford (1559)||Edward Seymour, 1st Earl of Hertford||1559||1621||
|-
|Earl of Warwick (1561)||Ambrose Dudley, 1st Earl of Warwick||1561||1590||
|-
|Earl of Leicester (1564)||Robert Dudley, 1st Earl of Leicester||1564||1588||
|-
|rowspan="2"|Earl of Essex (1572)||Walter Devereux, 1st Earl of Essex||1572||1576||New creation; died
|-
|Robert Devereux, 2nd Earl of Essex||1576||1601||
|-
|Earl of Lincoln (1572)||Edward Clinton, 1st Earl of Lincoln||1572||1585||New creation
|-
|Viscount Hereford (1550)||Walter Devereux, 2nd Viscount Hereford||1558||1576||Created Earl of Essex, see above
|-
|Viscount Montagu (1554)||Anthony Browne, 1st Viscount Montagu||1554||1592||
|-
|Viscount Howard of Bindon (1559)||Thomas Howard, 1st Viscount Howard of Bindon||1559||1582||
|-
|Baron Grey de Wilton (1295)||Arthur Grey, 14th Baron Grey de Wilton||1562||1593||
|-
|Baron Clinton (1299)||Edward Clinton, 9th Baron Clinton||1517||1585||Created Earl of Lincoln, Barony held by his heirs until 1692, when it fell into abeyance
|- 
|rowspan="2"|Baron Morley (1299)||Henry Parker, 11th Baron Morley||1556||1577||Died
|- 
|Edward Parker, 12th Baron Morley||1577||1618||
|- 
|Baron Zouche of Haryngworth (1308)||Edward la Zouche, 11th Baron Zouche||1569||1625||
|- 
|Baron Audley of Heleigh (1313)||George Tuchet, 11th Baron Audley||1563||1617||
|- 
|Baron Cobham of Kent (1313)||William Brooke, 10th Baron Cobham||1558||1597||
|- 
|Baron Willoughby de Eresby (1313)||Catherine Willoughby, 12th Baroness Willoughby de Eresby||1526||1580||
|- 
|Baron Dacre (1321)||Gregory Fiennes, 10th Baron Dacre||1558||1594||
|- 
|Baron Bourchier (1342)||Anne Bourchier, 7th Baroness Bourchier||1540||1571||Died, Barony succeeded by the Earl of Essex, and held by his heirs until 1646, when it fell into abeyance
|- 
|Baron Scrope of Bolton (1371)||Henry Scrope, 9th Baron Scrope of Bolton||1549||1591||
|- 
|Baron Bergavenny (1392)||Henry Nevill, 6th Baron Bergavenny||1536||1585||
|- 
|Baron Berkeley (1421)||Henry Berkeley, 7th Baron Berkeley||1534||1613||
|- 
|Baron Latimer (1432)||John Neville, 4th Baron Latimer||1543||1577||Died, Barony fell into abeyance, until 1913
|- 
|Baron Dudley (1440)||Edward Sutton, 4th Baron Dudley||1553||1586||
|- 
|rowspan="2"|Baron Saye and Sele (1447)||Richard Fiennes, 6th Baron Saye and Sele||1528||1573||Died
|- 
|Richard Fiennes, 7th Baron Saye and Sele||1573||1613||
|- 
|Baron Stourton (1448)||John Stourton, 9th Baron Stourton||1557||1588||
|- 
|Baron Ogle (1461)||Cuthbert Ogle, 7th Baron Ogle||1562||1597||
|- 
|Baron Mountjoy (1465)||James Blount, 6th Baron Mountjoy||1544||1582||
|- 
|Baron Willoughby de Broke (1491)||Fulke Greville, 4th Baron Willoughby de Broke||1562||1606||
|- 
|Baron Monteagle (1514)||William Stanley, 3rd Baron Monteagle||1560||1581||
|-
|Baron Vaux of Harrowden (1523)||William Vaux, 3rd Baron Vaux of Harrowden||1556||1595||
|-
|Baron Sandys of the Vine (1529)||William Sandys, 3rd Baron Sandys||1560||1623||
|-
|Baron Burgh (1529)||William Burgh, 2nd Baron Burgh||1550||1584||
|-
|rowspan="2"|Baron Windsor (1529)||Edward Windsor, 3rd Baron Windsor||1558||1574||Died
|-
|Frederick Windsor, 4th Baron Windsor||1574||1585||
|-
|Baron Wentworth (1529)||Thomas Wentworth, 2nd Baron Wentworth||1551||1584||
|-
|rowspan="2"|Baron Mordaunt (1532)||John Mordaunt, 2nd Baron Mordaunt||1562||1571||Died
|-
|Lewis Mordaunt, 3rd Baron Mordaunt||1571||1601||
|-
|Baron Cromwell (1540)||Henry Cromwell, 2nd Baron Cromwell||1551||1593||
|-
|Baron Eure (1544)||William Eure, 2nd Baron Eure||1548||1594||
|-
|rowspan="2"|Baron Wharton (1545)||Thomas Wharton, 2nd Baron Wharton||1568||1572||Died
|-
|Philip Wharton, 3rd Baron Wharton||1572||1625||
|-
|Baron Sheffield (1547)||Edmund Sheffield, 3rd Baron Sheffield||1568||1646||
|-
|Baron Rich (1547)||Robert Rich, 2nd Baron Rich||1567||1581||
|-
|rowspan="2"|Baron Willoughby of Parham (1547)||William Willoughby, 1st Baron Willoughby of Parham||1547||1570||Died
|-
|Charles Willoughby, 2nd Baron Willoughby of Parham||1570||1612||
|-
|Baron Lumley (1547)||John Lumley, 1st Baron Lumley||1547||1609||
|-
|Baron Darcy of Aston (1548)||John Darcy, 2nd Baron Darcy of Aston||1558||1602||
|-
|Baron Darcy of Chiche (1551)||John Darcy, 2nd Baron Darcy of Chiche||1558||1581||
|-
|Baron Paget (1552)||Thomas Paget, 3rd Baron Paget||1563||1589||
|-
|Baron North (1554)||Roger North, 2nd Baron North||1564||1600||
|-
|rowspan="2"|Baron Howard of Effingham (1554)||William Howard, 1st Baron Howard of Effingham||1554||1573||Died
|-
|Charles Howard, 2nd Baron Howard of Effingham||1573||1624||
|-
|rowspan="2"|Baron Chandos (1554)||Edmund Brydges, 2nd Baron Chandos||1557||1573||Died
|-
|Giles Brydges, 3rd Baron Chandos||1573||1594||
|-
|Baron Hastings of Loughborough (1558)||Edward Hastings, 1st Baron Hastings of Loughborough||1558||1572||Died, title extinct
|-
|Baron Hunsdon (1559)||Henry Carey, 1st Baron Hunsdon||1559||1596||
|-
|Baron St John of Bletso (1559)||Oliver St John, 1st Baron St John of Bletso||1559||1582||
|-
|Baron Buckhurst (1567)||Thomas Sackville, 1st Baron Buckhurst||1567||1608||
|-
|Baron De La Warr (1570)||William West, 1st Baron De La Warr||1570||1595||New creation
|-
|Baron Burghley (1571)||William Cecil, 1st Baron Burghley||1571||1598||New creation
|-
|Baron Cheyne of Toddington (1572)||Henry Cheyne, 1st Baron Cheyne||1572||1587||New creation
|-
|Baron Compton (1572)||Henry Compton, 1st Baron Compton||1572||1589||New creation
|-
|Baron Norreys (1572)||Henry Norris, 1st Baron Norreys||1572||1601||New creation
|-
|}

Peerage of Scotland

|Duke of Rothesay (1398)||none||1567||1594||
|-
|rowspan=2|Earl of Mar (1114)||John Erskine, 18th/1st Earl of Mar||1565||1572||Died
|-
|John Erskine, 19th/2nd Earl of Mar||1572||1634||
|-
|Earl of Sutherland (1235)||Alexander Gordon, 12th Earl of Sutherland||1567||1594||
|-
|Earl of Angus (1389)||Archibald Douglas, 8th Earl of Angus||1558||1588||
|-
|rowspan=2|Earl of Crawford (1398)||David Lindsay, 10th Earl of Crawford||1558||1574||Died
|-
|David Lindsay, 11th Earl of Crawford||1574||1607||
|-
|rowspan=2|Earl of Menteith (1427)||William Graham, 5th Earl of Menteith||1565||1578||Died
|-
|John Graham, 6th Earl of Menteith||1578||1598||
|-
|rowspan=2|Earl of Huntly (1445)||George Gordon, 5th Earl of Huntly||1565||1579||Died
|-
|George Gordon, 6th Earl of Huntly||1579||1636||
|-
|rowspan=2|Earl of Erroll (1452)||George Hay, 7th Earl of Erroll||1541||1573||Died
|-
|Andrew Hay, 8th Earl of Erroll||1573||1585||
|-
|Earl of Caithness (1455)||George Sinclair, 4th Earl of Caithness||1529||1582||
|-
|rowspan=2|Earl of Argyll (1457)||Archibald Campbell, 5th Earl of Argyll||1558||1573||Died
|-
|Colin Campbell, 6th Earl of Argyll||1573||1584||
|-
|rowspan=2|Earl of Atholl (1457)||John Stewart, 4th Earl of Atholl||1542||1579||Died
|-
|John Stewart, 5th Earl of Atholl||1579||1595||
|-
|Earl of Morton (1458)||James Douglas, 4th Earl of Morton||1550||1581||
|-
|Earl of Rothes (1458)||Andrew Leslie, 5th Earl of Rothes||1558||1611||
|-
|Earl Marischal (1458)||William Keith, 4th Earl Marischal||1530||1581||
|-
|Earl of Buchan (1469)||Christina Stewart, 4th Countess of Buchan||1551||1580||
|-
|rowspan=3|Earl of Glencairn (1488)||Alexander Cunningham, 5th Earl of Glencairn||1541||1574||Died
|-
|William Cunningham, 6th Earl of Glencairn||1574||1578||
|-
|James Cunningham, 7th Earl of Glencairn||1578||1630||
|-
|Earl of Lennox (1488)||Matthew Stewart, 4th Earl of Lennox||1526||1571||Died, title merged in the Crown
|-
|rowspan=2|Earl of Arran (1503)||James Hamilton, 2nd Earl of Arran||1529||1575||Died
|-
|James Hamilton, 3rd Earl of Arran||1575||1609||
|-
|rowspan=2|Earl of Montrose (1503)||William Graham, 2nd Earl of Montrose||1513||1571||Died
|-
|John Graham, 3rd Earl of Montrose||1571||1608||
|-
|Earl of Eglinton (1507)||Hugh Montgomerie, 3rd Earl of Eglinton||1546||1585||
|-
|rowspan=2|Earl of Cassilis (1509)||Gilbert Kennedy, 4th Earl of Cassilis||1558||1576||Died
|-
|John Kennedy, 5th Earl of Cassilis||1576||1615||
|-
|rowspan=2|Earl of Moray (1562)||James Stewart, 1st Earl of Moray||1562||1570||Died
|-
|Elizabeth Stuart, 2nd Countess of Moray||1570||1591||
|-
|Earl of Lennox (1572)||Charles Stuart, 1st Earl of Lennox||1572||1576||New creation; died, title extinct
|-
|Earl of Lennox (1578)||Robert Stewart, 1st Earl of Lennox||1578||1580||New creation
|-
|Lord Somerville (1430)||Hugh Somerville, 7th Lord Somerville||1569||1597||
|-
|Lord Forbes (1442)||William Forbes, 7th Lord Forbes||1547||1593||
|-
|Lord Maxwell (1445)||John Maxwell, 8th Lord Maxwell||1555||1593||
|-
|rowspan=2|Lord Glamis (1445)||John Lyon, 8th Lord Glamis||1558||1578||Died
|-
|Patrick Lyon, 9th Lord Glamis||1578||1615||
|-
|Lord Lindsay of the Byres (1445)||Patrick Lindsay, 6th Lord Lindsay||1563||1589||
|-
|Lord Saltoun (1445)||Alexander Abernethy, 6th Lord Saltoun||1543||1587||
|-
|Lord Gray (1445)||Patrick Gray, 4th Lord Gray||1541||1584||
|-
|rowspan=2|Lord Sinclair (1449)||William Sinclair, 4th Lord Sinclair||1513||1570||Died
|-
|Henry Sinclair, 5th Lord Sinclair||1570||1601||
|-
|rowspan=2|Lord Fleming (1451)||John Fleming, 5th Lord Fleming||1558||1572||Died
|-
|John Fleming, 6th Lord Fleming||1572||1619||
|-
|Lord Seton (1451)||George Seton, 7th Lord Seton||1549||1586||
|-
|Lord Borthwick (1452)||William Borthwick, 6th Lord Borthwick||1566||1582||
|-
|Lord Boyd (1454)||Robert Boyd, 5th Lord Boyd||1558||1590||
|-
|Lord Oliphant (1455)||Laurence Oliphant, 4th Lord Oliphant||1566||1593||
|-
|Lord Livingston (1458)||William Livingstone, 6th Lord Livingston||1553||1592||
|-
|Lord Cathcart (1460)||Alan Cathcart, 4th Lord Cathcart||1547||1618||
|-
|rowspan=2|Lord Lovat (1464)||Hugh Fraser, 5th Lord Lovat||1558||1577||Died
|-
|Simon Fraser, 6th Lord Lovat||1577||1633||
|-
|Lord Innermeath (1470)||James Stewart, 5th Lord Innermeath||1569||1585||
|-
|rowspan=2|Lord Carlyle of Torthorwald (1473)||Michael Carlyle, 4th Lord Carlyle||1526||1575||Died
|-
|Elizabeth Douglas, 5th Lady Carlyle||1575||1605||
|-
|rowspan=2|Lord Home (1473)||Alexander Home, 5th Lord Home||1549||1575||Died
|-
|Alexander Home, 6th Lord Home||1575||1619||
|-
|Lord Ruthven (1488)||William Ruthven, 4th Lord Ruthven||1566||1584||
|-
|Lord Crichton of Sanquhar (1488)||Robert Crichton, 8th Lord Crichton of Sanquhar||1569||1612||
|-
|rowspan=2|Lord Drummond of Cargill (1488)||David Drummond, 2nd Lord Drummond||1519||1571||Died
|-
|Patrick Drummond, 3rd Lord Drummond||1571||1600||
|-
|Lord Hay of Yester (1488)||William Hay, 5th Lord Hay of Yester||1557||1586||
|-
|rowspan=2|Lord Sempill (1489)||Robert Sempill, 3rd Lord Sempill||1552||1576||Died
|-
|Robert Sempill, 4th Lord Sempill||1576||1611||
|-
|Lord Herries of Terregles (1490)||Agnes Maxwell, 4th Lady Herries of Terregles||1543||1594||
|-
|Lord Ogilvy of Airlie (1491)||James Ogilvy, 5th Lord Ogilvy of Airlie||1549||1606||
|-
|Lord Ross (1499)||James Ross, 4th Lord Ross||1556||1581||
|-
|Lord Elphinstone (1509)||Robert Elphinstone, 3rd Lord Elphinstone||1547||1602||
|-
|rowspan=2|Lord Methven (1528)||Henry Stewart, 2nd Lord Methven||1552||1572||Died
|-
|Henry Stewart, 3rd Lord Methven||1572||1580||
|-
|Lord Ochiltree (1543)||Andrew Stewart, 2nd Lord Ochiltree||1548||1591||
|-
|rowspan=2|Lord Torphichen (1564)||James Sandilands, 1st Lord Torphichen||1564||1579||Died
|-
|James Sandilands, 2nd Lord Torphichen||1579||1617||
|-
|}

Peerage of Ireland

|Earl of Kildare (1316)||Gerald FitzGerald, 11th Earl of Kildare||1569||1585||
|-
|Earl of Ormond (1328)||Thomas Butler, 10th Earl of Ormond||1546||1614||
|-
|Earl of Desmond (1329)||Gerald FitzGerald, 15th Earl of Desmond||1558||1582||
|-
|Earl of Waterford (1446)||George Talbot, 6th Earl of Waterford||1560||1590||
|-
|Earl of Tyrone (1542)||Hugh O'Neill, 3rd Earl of Tyrone||1562||1608||
|-
|Earl of Clanricarde (1543)||Richard Burke, 2nd Earl of Clanricarde||1544||1582||
|-
|Earl of Thomond (1543)||Connor O'Brien, 3rd Earl of Thomond||1553||1581||
|-
|Earl of Clancare (1565)||Donald McCarthy, 1st Earl of Clancare||1565||1597||
|-
|Viscount Gormanston (1478)||Christopher Preston, 4th Viscount Gormanston||1569||1599||
|-
|Viscount Buttevant (1541)||James de Barry, 4th Viscount Buttevant||1557||1581||
|-
|rowspan=2|Viscount Baltinglass (1541)||Rowland Eustace, 2nd Viscount Baltinglass||1549||1578||Died
|-
|James Eustace, 3rd Viscount Baltinglass||1578||1585||
|-
|rowspan=2|Viscount Mountgarret (1550)||Richard Butler, 1st Viscount Mountgarret||1550||1571||Died
|-
|Edmund Butler, 2nd Viscount Mountgarret||1571||1602||
|-
|Viscount Decies (1569)||Maurice Fitzgerald, 1st Viscount Decies||1569||1572||Died, title extinct
|-
|Baron Athenry (1172)||Richard II de Bermingham||1547||1580||
|-
|Baron Kingsale (1223)||Gerald de Courcy, 17th Baron Kingsale||1535||1599||
|-
|Baron Kerry (1223)||Thomas Fitzmaurice, 16th Baron Kerry||1550||1590||
|-
|rowspan=2|Baron Slane (1370)||James Fleming, 9th Baron Slane||1517||1578||Died
|-
|Thomas Fleming, 10th Baron Slane||1578||1597||
|-
|Baron Howth (1425)||Christopher St Lawrence, 8th Baron Howth||1558||1589||
|-
|Baron Killeen (1449)||James Plunkett, 8th Baron Killeen||1567||1595||
|-
|rowspan=2|Baron Trimlestown (1461)||Robert Barnewall, 5th Baron Trimlestown||1562||1573||Died
|-
|Peter Barnewall, 6th Baron Trimlestown||1573||1598||
|-
|Baron Dunsany (1462)||Patrick Plunkett, 7th Baron of Dunsany||1564||1601||
|-
|Baron Delvin (1486)||Christopher Nugent, 6th Baron Delvin||1559||1602||
|-
|Baron Power (1535)||John Power, 3rd Baron Power||1545||1592||
|-
|Baron Dunboyne (1541)||James Butler, 2nd/12th Baron Dunboyne||1566||1624||
|-
|rowspan=3|Baron Louth (1541)||Thomas Plunkett, 2nd Baron Louth||1555||1571||Died
|-
|Patrick Plunkett, 3rd Baron Louth||1571||1575||Died
|-
|Oliver Plunkett, 4th Baron Louth||1575||1607||
|-
|rowspan=2|Baron Upper Ossory (1541)||Barnaby Fitzpatrick, 1st Baron Upper Ossory||1541||1575||Died
|-
|Barnaby Fitzpatrick, 2nd Baron Upper Ossory||1575||1581||
|-
|rowspan=2|Baron Inchiquin (1543)||Murrough McDermot O'Brien, 3rd Baron Inchiquin||1557||1573||Died
|-
|Murrough O'Brien, 4th Baron Inchiquin||1573||1597||
|-
|}

References

 

Lists of peers by decade
1570s in England
1570s in Ireland
16th century in England
16th century in Scotland
16th century in Ireland
16th-century English nobility
16th-century Scottish peers
16th-century Irish people
Peers